Izzat Ghazzawi (1951 – April 4, 2003) was a Palestinian writer born in Deir al-Ghusun in Tulkarm Governorate. He wrote about the sufferings of the Palestinian people and was arrested many times by Israeli authorities for "political activities". He was a professor at Birzeit University and was awarded the Sakharov Prize for freedom of thought in 2001.

References

1951 births
Palestinian non-fiction writers
2003 deaths
Birzeit University alumni
Sakharov Prize laureates
People from Deir al-Ghusun
20th-century non-fiction writers